The Carnot Institute ARTS (Actions for Research, Technology and Society ; in French, Actions de recherche pour la technologie et la société) is a French research institute. It was originally created to group the 15 laboratories of the engineering school Arts et Métiers ParisTech. It received the seal of approval "Carnot Institute" in 2006.

Creation

ARTS was among the first 20 institutes to be certified by the French Minister of higher education and research.

Laboratories

The laboratories are spread in the 8 centers of teaching and research of Arts et Métiers ParisTech. Some of them have satellite facilities in the 3 institutes of research of Arts et Métiers ParisTech and in the buildings of research partners like CNAM or école navale.

Departments

The laboratories are organized in 3 departments:

 Design, Industrialization, Risk, Decision (CIRD)
 Mechanics, Materials, Processes (M2P)
 Fluids and Energy (FISE)

Labs by locations

The list of the laboratories grouped by main locations :

Paris
Laboratory of fluid dynamics (DynFluid)
Laboratory of biomechanics (LBM)
Laboratory of product design and innovation (LCPI)
Laboratory of process, mechanical and material engineering (PIMM)
Institute of aerotechnics (IAT)
Paris Design Lab (PDL)
Properties and architectures of alloys and mixes (P2AM)
LAboratory of energy process, environment and health (LGP2ES)
Lille
Lille Laboratory of Mechanics (LML)
Lille Laboratory of Electrical Engineering and Power Electronics (L2EP)
Thermodynamics, flows, mechanics, material sciences, forming, manufacturing (TEMPO)
Cluny
Burgundy laboratory of material sciences and process (LaBoMaP)
Laboratory of electronics and digital imaging (LE2I)
Team of technological research and development (ERDT)
Interdisciplinary Carnot laboratory of burgundy (ICB)
Team of research material-process (ERMPV)
Angers
Arts et Métiers ParisTech laboratory of Angers (LAMPA)
Aix-en-Provence
Laboratory of IT and systems (LSIS-INSM)
Bordeaux
Institute of mechanics and engineering (I2M)
Metz
Laboratory of Microstructure Studies and Mechanics of Materials (LEM3)
Laboratory of design, manufacturing and control (LCFC)
Châlons-en-Champagne
Laboratory of mechanics, surface, material sciences and process (MSMP)

Contracts

The contracts with private companies or with ANR (National agency for research) raised up to 12 million euros each year.

Notes and references

 
French National Centre for Scientific Research
Arts et Métiers ParisTech